Paradise Airlines Flight 901A was a scheduled passenger flight from San Jose, California, to South Lake Tahoe, California.  On March1, 1964, the Lockheed L-049 Constellation serving the flight crashed near Genoa Peak, on the eastern side of Lake Tahoe, killing all 85 aboard and destroying the plane.   An investigation concluded that the primary cause of the accident was the pilot's decision to attempt a visual landing approach in adverse weather.  After aborting the landing attempt, the pilot lost awareness of his location as he flew below the minimum safe altitude in mountainous terrain.   He likely tried to fly through a low mountain pass in an attempt to divert to the airport in Reno, Nevada, and crashed into the left shoulder of the pass.  At the time, it was the second-worst single-plane crash in United States history, and remains the worst accident involving the Lockheed L-049 Constellation.

The airline involved, Paradise Airlines, was a two-year-old company that operated discount excursion flights from the San Francisco Bay Area to Lake Tahoe.  After the accident, investigators from the Federal Aviation Administration (FAA) uncovered multiple safety violations by the company and grounded all of its flights.  After an unsuccessful appeal by the company, the FAA revoked its operating certificate and Paradise Airlines permanently shut down.

Accident

Flight 901A was one of two daily passenger flights operated by Paradise Airlines between San Jose and Lake Tahoe. On the morning of Sunday,  March1, 1964, it took off from the company's base at the Oakland International Airport with only the four crew members aboard, and made a pre-arranged stop at nearby Salinas Airport to pick up a group of eighteen passengers before proceeding to San Jose Airport, where a full load was waiting. There was only space for 63 of the waiting passengers; the remaining 15 travelers were unable to board because the aircraft was filled to capacity, and shuttled by bus to Oakland to catch a later flight. The aircraft, with 81 passengers and 4 crew members, departed San Jose at 10:39a.m. PST for the 50-minute flight to Lake Tahoe. The passengers who had been bussed to Oakland eventually learned that the later flight  was canceled due to poor weather in the mountains.

Although the U.S. Weather Bureau forecast for the Lake Tahoe region predicted poor flight conditions for aircraft, the Paradise Airlines dispatcher estimated that by the time Flight 901A would be arriving in the area, weather conditions would have improved, so he approved the aircraft's departure. En route, the crew of Flight 901A spoke to the company's other plane by radio, which had just left the Tahoe Airport on its way to Oakland. At 11:21a.m., the pilot of Flight 901A, near Lake Tahoe, reported that he had spotted a break in the cloud cover, that he could see the airport on the south shore of the lake, and that he was going to proceed with a visual approach. At 11:27 a.m., the pilots contacted the passenger agent for Paradise Airlines at Tahoe Valley Airport to let him know they would be arriving shortly. The agent informed them that the 11:00a.m. Weather Bureau report described the weather conditions as overcast,  estimated ceiling, with  visibility.

A witness on the ground reported that she saw the plane flying toward the airport, on the south end of Lake Tahoe, not showing any signs of a problem. She watched the aircraft approach the airport until it disappeared behind thin clouds, then heard the engines add power. Another witness further north saw the plane, with its gear up and the gear doors closed, flying towards the lake. Shortly afterward, the witness described the weather rapidly deteriorating into blizzard conditions. At 11:30 a.m., three witnesses on the eastern shore of Lake Tahoe reported hearing a "large aircraft" flying overhead, heading in an easterly or northeasterly direction. At the time, it was snowing heavily and none of the witnesses saw the aircraft. Some of the witnesses said they heard the engine sounds abruptly stop, but they did not hear an explosion or a crash.

The aircraft struck the ground near the crest of a ridge on Genoa Peak, Nevada. Just before impact, the plane struck several of the trees on the ridge's west slope, and the pattern of damage to the trees showed that the aircraft was flying almost level at the time. If the aircraft had been  more to the right at the altitude it was flying, it would have cleared the ridge.
  
Paradise Airlines had been operating as an intrastate airline in California for about two years, and had not had any accidents in its history before this flight. It is the worst accident involving the Lockheed L-049 Constellation, and at the time was the second worst single-plane accident in United States history.

Aftermath

When the aircraft was discovered to be missing, search efforts commenced, but because of the heavy snowstorms in the Tahoe area, efforts were severely limited on the first day. Two small boats searched along a  stretch of the lake's shore, but by nightfall, the searchers had found no traces of the missing aircraft.  Experienced ski rescue crews and mountaineers waited for a break in the weather before they could join the search. By dawn the next morning, the weather had cleared enough to permit a large-scale search. Air Force Lt. Col Alexander Sherry headed the operation, involving more than fifty planes and hundreds of people. At 7:36 a.m., an Air Force helicopter spotted the wreckage of the aircraft on the ridge. A second helicopter landed at the site and confirmed that the wreckage was from the missing flight, and that there were no survivors.  Looters had already been to the site and stolen cash and jewelry from the crash victims.

Douglas County Sheriff deputies led a group of off-road vehicles to the crash scene and left two deputies the overnight to guard the wreckage. A bulldozer cleared a  road to the site along an old logging track to make it easier for rescuers and investigators to reach it. Civil Aeronautics Board (CAB) investigators arrived at the scene of the crash and began to sift through the wreckage of the aircraft for clues to why it crashed. Most of the wreckage was shattered into tiny pieces, with only a few recognizable parts.  Portions of the four engines had burned, and there was evidence that a small area of the crash site had burned for four or five hours.  The impact site was so close to the top of the ridge that the aircraft's nose wheel was found on the other side of the mountain.

Rescuers estimated that because of the rugged terrain and the deep snow, it would take several days or possibly even months until after the Spring thaw before all the victims could be recovered. The first seven were brought to a makeshift morgue in the CVIC hall in Minden, Nevada, on March3, two days after the crash, where technicians from the Federal Bureau of Investigation began the process of identification. An additional 43 were brought the next day, with officials hurrying to recover bodies before an incoming snowstorm buried them in the snow, making them even harder to locate.  The Air Force flew in a helicopter to help shuttle the bodies down from the ridge. Two large Army helicopters brought in three  mobile hot air furnaces to the site to help melt away the snow. By March6, searchers had located and recovered all but two of the victims. The last two were eventually located, but by March9, officials had only been able to recover one of them before poor weather forced them to halt recovery operations. The final victim was removed from the site on March30, about a month after the crash. Douglas County District Attorney John Chrislaw reported that Paradise Airlines refused to pay the $300 per victim mortuary expenses of handling the remains, leaving the victims' relatives to bear the cost. Paradise Airlines president Herman Jones denied the report, saying that the expenses would be paid by the airline's insurance company.

Airline grounded

After cancelling flights immediately after the crash, Paradise Airlines resumed flights to Lake Tahoe on the morning of March3, two days after the accident. The FAA immediately ordered an emergency suspension of all flights by the airline, which took effect at noon that same day. The suspension order said that the airline had shown "a lack of ability and qualifications to conduct a safe intrastate common carrier passenger operation". The agency said that the airline could appeal the suspension, but that in the meantime, it could not conduct flights until a decision was made on the appeal. FAA regional Director Joseph Tippets said that the reason the agency was being so strict with the airline was because Flight 901A had been dispatched on its fatal flight at a time when the weather conditions at the destination airport would not have permitted a safe landing. He said that the same day, the airline had also allowed its other aircraft to take off from Lake Tahoe Airport in during a time when the local weather conditions prohibited it. Both planes had been flying in conditions where icing would have been likely, but neither of them were equipped with wing de-icing equipment. Instead, the front edges of the wings of the two aircraft had simply been painted black, which made it look like they had de-icing equipment installed.

Company president Herman Jones told reporters that he was puzzled by the FAA's action, saying that to his knowledge, the agency had found no problems with the company's operation or its paperwork. In the days following the suspension, he also said that he believed that the FAA's "over-restrictive rules" about flying in adverse weather conditions was to blame for the accident. According to him, the aircraft was only three or four miles from the Tahoe Airport and that the pilots might have already had had the airport in sight by the time the Tahoe Airport agent told them that the weather report stated that there was only a  ceiling.  Jones said that instead of landing safely, the pilot probably decided to fly over to Reno in order to avoid being cited by the FAA for landing in violation of the airport weather minimums.

At the outset of the appeal hearing before the FAA, Paradise Airlines tried to argue that the agency had no jurisdiction over the company because it was an intrastate airline that normally operated only within state boundaries. That argument proved unpersuasive, and once the hearing commenced, attention was first focused on the company dispatcher that had approved the flight despite the poor weather conditions. At 25 years old, he was very inexperienced and had been employed by the company for only one month.  He had limited fluency in the English language, and in response to questioning by the FAA, was unable to provide explanations of crucial weather terms that appeared in that day's forecast. He testified that he had used his own judgment and predicted that weather conditions at Tahoe Airport would be safe enough for the flight to land by the time it arrived.  However, when he was given several examples of different weather conditions during the hearing, he was unable to accurately describe how those weather conditions could affect flight safety.  In a later part of the hearing, FAA investigators revealed that the Tahoe Valley operations manager for Paradise Airlines had made changes to notes made by the airport's official weather observer on the morning of the flight. Operations manager Raymond Rickard testified that he had written in a minus sign in front of a certain meteorological symbol on the report, which changed its meaning from "broken cloud ceiling" to "thin, broken clouds". He said, "I knew [the observer] would not let us dispatch an airplane under the conditions he'd written, so I just inserted the minus sign." He said he did this because he had heard the observer tell another pilot that it was all right to take off, so he thought that the observer had just made a mistake on the report. However, the observer testified that he was positive that he had seen weather conditions well below minimum operating conditions that morning. Another FAA investigator testified that Paradise Airlines had violated civil air regulations several times in the three months before the accident, mostly involving weather conditions. On April 6, the company lost its appeal of the FAA order grounding the company's aircraft. Paradise Airlines president Herman Jones called the hearings as "a great miscarriage of justice" and vowed to keep the company's planes flying, with or without an air operator's certificate. FAA representatives countered that if the company attempted to fly without a certificate, the United States Marshals Service would seize the aircraft involved. After the ruling, the airline shut down.

Aircraft

The aircraft was a Lockheed L-049 Constellation, serial number 2025 and registered with tail number N86504.  Assembly of the aircraft finished in December1945, and at the time of the crash it been operated for 45,629 hours. It was equipped with four Wright R-3350 Duplex-Cyclone propeller engines that had undergone a total overhaul within the past 1,300 flight hours.

The plane was owned by Nevada Airmotive Corporation of Las Vegas, and had been leased to Paradise Airlines since June1963. In its past, it had been operated by Trans World Airlines before it was retired. Paradise Airlines had flown it a total of 551 hours.  According to the FAA, the type of aircraft was well suited for operation in high altitude, mountainous airports like Lake Tahoe, due to its relatively slow speed and high maneuverability.

Passengers and crew
Paradise Airlines Flight 901A carried 81 passengers and 4 crew on its final flight. Nearly all of the passengers were from the Salinas and San Jose areas. All but two of the eighteen passengers that the airline had picked up at its Salinas stop were employees of the same company, the Monte Mar Development company of Salinas and Monterey.

The pilot of the flight was Henry Norris, age 45, who had been employed with the airline since November1963. He had 15,391 hours of flight time, including 3,266 hours in Lockheed Constellation type aircraft. He had served in the Air Transport Command during World War II and had flown as a pilot for Modern Air Transport and World Airways and served as the director of training for Alaska Airlines. He was unmarried and a resident of Alameda, California.

The first officer, 28-year-old Donald A. Watson, of San Francisco, had been employed with the company since March1963. He had 3,553 flight hours of experience, including 149 hours instrument time and 1,353 hours in the Lockheed Constellation.  Before joining Paradise Airlines, he had served as a mechanic with Pan American Airways and a pilot with Flying Tiger Line.

The flight engineer, Jack C. Worthley, 33, of Fremont, California, had been employed with the company since October1963. He had 3,700 flight hours as a flight engineer, including 912 hours on the Lockheed Constellation.  He was the father of three children and was a native of Seattle.

Investigation
Investigators from the CAB, headed by George R. Baker, arrived at the headquarters of Paradise Airlines on the day the plane went missing, even before the crash site had been located. Just as company president Herman Jones was about to meet with officials from the CAB and the FAA the next morning, word came in that the crash site had been located. After the meeting, investigators impounded all of the company's records. More than thirty CAB investigators were involved in the probe, studying the maintenance records of the plane, interviewing witnesses, studying the weather reports, and examining pieces of the wreckage for indications of the cause of the crash. The aircraft was not equipped with a cockpit voice recorder. All four propeller hub assemblies were located and shipped, with the broken propeller blades, to a shop in Hayward, California, to determine how much power the engines were generating when the plane crashed. By May1, investigators had recovered the key instruments and the radio equipment of the crashed plane. A salvage operator began removing the rest of the plane, taking the pieces to a warehouse at Reid–Hillview Airport near San Jose and storing them there in case they were needed by CAB investigators.

The CAB held a probable cause hearing in Oakland between June2 and 5. The investigative team learned that pilots had made 11 reports of problems with the plane's directional instruments in the months before the crash. Testimony from the Tahoe Airport's weather observer repeated some of what was said during the appeal of the FAA's suspension of Paradise Airlines' operating certificate. The pilot of the Paradise Airlines flight that left Lake Tahoe an hour before the crash testified that he took off because the weather observer assured him that the weather was clear enough, but the observer said that he did not recall such a conversation. The pilot was asked about the company's procedures for operating in bad weather, and the company's financial arrangements with its pilots.  He explained that the pilots were paid a flat fee of $35 per flight. In the hearing, the CAB interviewer hinted that the flat fee payment arrangements gave an incentive to pilots to avoid diversions due to bad weather because they would not be paid for their additional time. Investigators learned that neither of the company's aircraft operating at the Tahoe Airport had been equipped with de-icing equipment, and that Flight 802 had picked up rime ice half an inch thick when it was flying out of the Tahoe Valley earlier that day. They also learned that the maintenance records of the company's aircraft had several discrepancies, but that the FAA had no enforcement actions pending at the time of the crash. Previous flight crews had noted minor errors in the altimeters aboard the aircraft, and instrument repairmen had worked on both altimeters in the plane that crashed on the day before. The right-hand fluxgate compass was known to be faulty on the day of the crash, with crews reporting that it was "completely unreliable in any kind of banking turn". Instrument technicians had worked on it two days earlier, but it was still not functioning reliably. Investigators learned that there had been gaps in the cloud cover when the flight had arrived, but a snow squall hit the north end of the airport just as the aircraft was approaching from the north for landing.

On July15, 1965, the CAB released its final report. The report stated that the crash was caused by pilot error, a falsified weather report, and illegal maintenance practices. The accident report stated:

The CAB report stated that maintenance had been performed on both altimeters and the No.2 fluxgate compass transmitter on the evening before the accident. Paradise Airlines did not have any of its own maintenance personnel, and used an FAA-approved maintenance company located at Oakland Airport.  The technicians who had performed the work had also inspected and signed off on their own work. The report stated the mechanic who had worked on the compass had never worked on that type of transmitter, and did not refer to any technical publications for guidance. He failed to check the entire system and did not perform all of the actions outlined in the maintenance manual. The technician who performed the work on the altimeters could not remember whether or not he had secured the barometric adjusting screw that he had unscrewed during the adjustments he had made. The reinstallation of the unit had been performed by a mechanic who had never performed that type of work before, and had been done without performing all of the checks outlined in the manual.  The captain's altimeter that was recovered from the wreckage showed a pre-impact discrepancy that would have caused the pilot to believe the aircraft was flying  higher than its true altitude.  In addition, the compass had an error of 15 degrees or more, which would have meant that the aircraft's actual course could have been more to the north than what the instruments were indicating to the pilots.

Weather reports that were available to the company dispatcher included warnings of icing conditions in the Tahoe Airport area and that clouds and snow showers would be obscuring the mountains in western Nevada.  None of this information was communicated to the captain of Flight 901A before or during the flight, and the board speculated that ice accumulation on the aircraft may have affected its ability to gain sufficient altitude to clear the mountains.

The report concluded that when the crew abandoned the approach to Tahoe Valley Airport, they decided to proceed through Daggett Pass for unknown reasons, possibly to avoid an area of known icing that they had passed through during their descent, or possibly because icing was preventing the aircraft from being able to climb higher.   The pilots would have been aware that an altitude of  would have given the aircraft  of terrain clearance through the pass's center, and an easterly heading from the southern end of the lake would have taken the aircraft through the pass's center, an opening several miles wide. The aircraft leveled off at 9,000 feet, either because the pilots believed that they had sufficient clearance, or because icing prevented further altitude gains. The report concluded that it was possible that the crew was unaware that its course, altitude, or both, were not being accurately shown on the aircraft's instruments, and that undetected tail winds might also have affected the flight's course.

References

Aviation accidents and incidents in the United States in 1964
Accidents and incidents involving the Lockheed Constellation
Airliner accidents and incidents in Nevada
1964 in Nevada
March 1964 events in the United States
Airliner accidents and incidents caused by pilot error
Accidents and incidents by airline of the United States